Boyz or The Boyz may refer to:

Music

Bands
The Boyz (German band), a German boy band of the 1990s
The Boyz (American band), an American rock band from Los Angeles, California, established in 1975
The Boyz (South Korean band), a South Korean boy group formed by IST Entertainment in 2017
Boy'z, a Hong Kong cantopop duo

Songs
 "Boyz" (M.I.A. song), 2007
 "Boyz" (Jesy Nelson song), 2021

Other uses
Boyz (film), a 2017 Marathi film
Boyz (magazine), a British weekly LGBT magazine

See also
Boys (disambiguation)